Goniaea ensicornis is a species of grasshopper in the family Acrididae.

References

ensicornis
Insects described in 1878